Lieutenant General Sir Jeremiah Mateparae  (born 14 November 1954) is a former New Zealand soldier who served as the 20th Governor-General of New Zealand between 2011 and 2016, the second Māori person to hold the office, after Sir Paul Reeves. A former officer in the New Zealand Army, he was Chief of the New Zealand Defence Force from 2006 to 2011, and then served as the director of the New Zealand Government Communications Security Bureau for five months in 2011. Following his term as governor-general, Mateparae was the High Commissioner of New Zealand to the United Kingdom between 2017 and 2020.

Early life
Mateparae was born on 14 November 1954 to the Andrews family in Wanganui. He was given to his mother's brother, a Mateparae, to be raised in the Māori customary adoption known as whāngai. His birth father and his adoptive father were both ministers in the Rātana Church. He is descended from the Ngāti Tūwharetoa and Ngāti Kahungunu tribes and also has links to Tūhoe and tribes in the upper Whanganui. He was raised in the Whanganui suburb of Castlecliff and attended Castlecliff Primary School, Rutherford Intermediate School and Wanganui High School.

Military career

Mateparae enlisted as a private in the Regular Force of the New Zealand Army in June 1972. In December 1976, he graduated from the Officer Cadet School, Portsea in Australia. He served in both battalions of the Royal New Zealand Infantry Regiment and in the New Zealand Special Air Service. He was a platoon commander in Singapore in 1979.

Mateparae had two operational postings to peace support missions, one 12-month tour of duty with the United Nations Truce Supervision Organization as the Chief Observer in Southern Lebanon from May 1994 to May 1995, and commanding the combined-force Peace Monitoring Group on Bougainville during Operation Belisi in 1998. On 24 December 1999, he was promoted to brigadier, in the post of Land Component Commander, Joint Forces New Zealand. From December 1999 to July 2001, he was the Joint Commander for New Zealand forces attached to the United Nations Transitional Administration in East Timor.

In February 2002, Mateparae was promoted to major general and became the Chief of General Staff. The title was changed in mid-2002 to Chief of Army. On 1 May 2006 he was promoted to lieutenant general and took up appointment as the Chief of Defence Force, New Zealand's senior uniformed military appointment, which he held until 24 January 2011.

On 26 August 2010, Prime Minister John Key announced the appointment of Mateparae as Director of the Government Communications Security Bureau. Mateparae was appointed for a five-year term commencing on 7 February 2011 but stepped down from the role on 1 July 2011.

Governor-General of New Zealand

On 8 March 2011, Prime Minister John Key announced the recommendation of Mateparae as the next Governor-General of New Zealand. The Queen of New Zealand made the appointment later that day. On 31 August 2011 he was sworn in as the governor-general for a five-year term.

On 20 May 2011, Mateparae was appointed an Additional Knight Grand Companion of the New Zealand Order of Merit and as an Additional Companion of the Queen's Service Order. He became Chancellor and Principal Knight Grand Companion of the New Zealand Order of Merit and Principal Companion of the Queen's Service Order upon taking office as governor-general, making him "His Excellency Lieutenant General The Right Honourable Sir Jeremiah Mateparae GNZM QSO".

During the 2019 Operation Burnham inquiry Mateparae admitted to providing inaccurate information to Parliament.

On 14 November 2012 Mateparae hosted a party for the 64th birthday of Charles, Prince of Wales who was visiting New Zealand, and for 64 New Zealanders, all of whom shared the same birthday of 14 November.

In April 2013 Mateparae travelled to Afghanistan to mark the end of New Zealand Defence Force's deployment there. In June 2014, he attended the 70th anniversary commemorations of D Day in Normandy with Queen Elizabeth II, other heads of government and world leaders, taking a number of New Zealand veterans with him.

Mateparae expanded on a tradition started by his predecessor, Sir Anand Satyanand in 2012, releasing the Governor-General's New Year Message on video for the first time.

High Commissioner to the United Kingdom
On 16 December 2016, it was announced that Mateparae would be New Zealand's next High Commissioner to the United Kingdom, replacing Sir Lockwood Smith in early 2017.

Personal life
Mateparae has three children with his first wife, Raewynne, who died in 1990, and two with his second wife, Janine.

Medals and awards

Mateparae has a Master of Arts with First Class Honours degree in International Relations and Strategic Studies from the University of Waikato, and received a Distinguished Alumni Award from Waikato in 2008. He is a Fellow of the New Zealand Institute of Management.

Mateparae was appointed an Additional Officer of the New Zealand Order of Merit in the 1999 New Year Honours, for his service in Bougainville. In May 2011 the Singapore government awarded him the Darjah Utama Bakti Cemerlang (Tentera) – Distinguished Service Order (Military). In June 2011 he was awarded Knight of Justice of the Order of St John in regards to him becoming Prior of the Order of St John in New Zealand.

Honorary degrees

Honorary degrees

Dates of rank

Arms

References

External links

New Zealand Governor General official website
NZDF biography

|-

|-

|-

|-

1954 births
Companions of the Queen's Service Order
Governors-General of New Zealand
High Commissioners of New Zealand to the United Kingdom
Graduates of the Staff College, Camberley
Knights Grand Companion of the New Zealand Order of Merit
Knights of Justice of the Order of St John
Living people
Chiefs of Defence Force (New Zealand)
Graduates of the Officer Cadet School, Portsea
New Zealand generals
New Zealand Māori public servants
New Zealand Māori soldiers
Ngāti Tūwharetoa people
Ngāti Kahungunu people
Ngāi Tūhoe people
People educated at Wanganui High School
People from Whanganui
Recipients of the Darjah Utama Bakti Cemerlang (Tentera)
University of Waikato alumni